A Gambler's Honor is a 1913 silent film featuring Harry Carey.

Cast
 Harry Carey - The Gambler
 Claire McDowell - Beth
 Henry B. Walthall - Beth's Brother
 William A. Carroll - In Bar
 John T. Dillon - In Bar
 Charles West - In Bar

See also
 Harry Carey filmography

External links

1913 films
1913 short films
American silent short films
American black-and-white films
Films directed by Anthony O'Sullivan
1910s American films